Juliana's Pony: Total System Failure is an album by Juliana Hatfield, released in 2000. It was released on the same day as Beautiful Creature. 

The songs "Total System Failure" and "Leather Pants" use the same music with different lyrics.

Production
The album was recorded as a trio, dubbed Juliana's Pony. Bass player Mikey Welsh co-wrote four songs. Although inspired by Hatfield's months-long stay in Los Angeles, the album was made in Austin, Texas.

Critical reception
Exclaim! wrote that "this is Hatfield at her funniest and most bitter, heaping bile on boy toys ('Houseboy'), All About Eve ladder-climbers ('My Protegee'), teenage girls in SUVs ('Road Wrath') and overly fertile families ('Breeders')." Trouser Press wrote: "It’s easily the weakest album in her career and sounds even worse when compared to the subtle path of Beautiful Creature, although there is something mortifyingly fascinating about the utterly disastrous tone in which Hatfield portrays her life and loves."

Track listing

Personnel
Juliana Hatfield – guitar, vocals
Zephan Courtney – drums
Mikey Welsh – bass, backing vocals

Production
Producer: Juliana Hatfield
Engineer: Brian Brown
Mastering: Brian Lee
Photography: Juliana Hatfield, Mikey Welsh

References

Juliana Hatfield albums
2000 albums
Zoë Records albums